The Huntington Rail Kings were an independent professional baseball team based in Huntington, West Virginia during the 1998 season.  The Rail Kings played in the Heartland League and played their home games in St. Cloud Commons.  The team was the third and final professional baseball team to be based in Huntington during the 1990s, after the Huntington Cubs (1991-1994) and the River City Rumblers (1995).  The franchise relocated to Huntington from Altoona, PA where they were known as the Altoona Rail Kings.

The Huntington Rail Kings were plagued by low attendance and folded operations 32 games into the 60 game season.  The Huntington Rail Kings finished with a record of 9-23.  They were coached by Mike Richmond.

Defunct independent baseball league teams
Sports in Huntington, West Virginia
Cabell County, West Virginia
Professional baseball teams in West Virginia
1998 establishments in West Virginia
1998 disestablishments in West Virginia
Baseball teams established in 1998
Baseball teams disestablished in 1998
Defunct baseball teams in West Virginia